Yellow Earth is a 1984 Chinese drama film. This film is telling a story of a young, village girl who bravely resists old-dated customs and searches for freedom. It was the directorial debut for Chen Kaige. The film's notable cinematography is by Zhang Yimou.  At the 24th Hong Kong Film Awards ceremony on 27 March 2005, a list of 100 Best Chinese Motion Pictures was tallied, and Yellow Earth came in fourth. The film was produced by Guangxi Film Studio.

Zhang Yimou, a colleague of Chen, photographed the film. Richard James Havis, author of Changing the Face of Chinese Cinema: An Interview with Chen Kaige, said that the film was the first Chinese film "at least since the 1949 Communist Liberation, to tell a story through images rather than dialog." Therefore, the film attracted controversy in China. Havis added that the film "was also equivocal about the Communist Party's ability to help the peasants during the Communist revolution", a position which differed from that espoused by the propaganda films that were produced after 1949."

Plot 
Gu Qing, a soldier from the propaganda department of the CCP (Chinese Communist Party) Eighth Route Army in CCP-controlled Shaanxi, travels alone from Yan'an to the northern KMT-controlled area of Shaanxi, Shanbei, in the early spring of 1939, with the task of collecting the peasants' folk songs in order to re-write them with communist lyrics in order to boost the morale of the Eighth Route Army soldiers.

According to the academic article Color, Character, and Culture: On "Yellow Earth, Black Cannon Incident", and "Red Sorghum" by H. C. Li, Yellow Earth begins with a scene depicting a communist soldier walking several miles. He reaches a small village where he is assigned to live with a poor as well as illiterate family with the task of recording local folk songs for use in the propagandized communist cause. The father in the family, an old widower, dislikes Gu's re-telling of social reforms about women receiving education and choosing who they will marry on their own terms within the communist domain in the province's south, but Cuiqiao, his hard-working daughter, happily listens to his tales and is joyful when her younger brother, Hanhan, becomes friends with Gu. Gu learns the hardships of peasant life and especially that of Cuiqiao. The story then focuses on the girl, who at only age 14, is told that she must marry a significantly older man in only a few months' time as her wedding dowry was used to pay for her mother's funeral and brother's engagement. She is even more miserable when Gu informs them that he must return to Yan'an. The next morning, Hanhan accompanies Gu as he leaves and they part ways. However, Cuiqiao is waiting for Gu along the way and she pleads to go along with him. Gu does not know of her forced marriage so he convinces her to go back as she cannot follow without his army's permission, but he will come back for her one day. The wedding day comes and Cuiqiao is taken away in a bridal sedan. On the other hand, Gu has reached Yan'an and is now watching a drum-dance for new recruits fighting for the anti-Japanese war. Cuiqiao informs Hanhan that she wants to run away to join the army and she tells him to take care of their father and give Gu some hand-sewn insoles whenever he comes back. At night, she tries to cross the turbulent Yellow River while singing a song taught by Gu Qing, but whether she makes it across remains unclear.

Fast forward to another summer, Gu returns as he once promised Cuiqiao. But there is no one in the peasant family's home, so he goes into their village and sees countless peasants led by Cuiqiao's father praying and dancing for rain because the land has dried up and peoples' crops have died: "Dragon King of the Sea, let the good rains fall. Send cool wind and gentle rain to save us all!" Hanhan spots Gu and tries to go over to him, but a crowd of peasants obstructs his way. The film ends with the sound of Cuiqiao's song: "The piebald cock flies over the wall. The Communist Party shall save us all!" (96-97)

Cast 
Xueqi Wang as Gu Qing: A young, hard-working soldier of the CPP Eighth Route Army. He traveled to Shaanbei to collect folk songs and lived with Cui Qiao and her family.  In Cui Qiao's home, he described the beautiful scene of freedom and equality of the people of Yan'an, which deeply moved Cui Qiao. Few days later, he left Shaanbei. He refused to take Cui Qiao away because he could not do that without order from superior. When he finally returned to Shaanbei, he did not find Cui Qiao.

Bai Xue as Cui Qiao: A lively, brave, young girl who was the greatest singer in her village. Her mother died when she was young, and she lived with her father and brother (Hanhan). She was touched by Gu Qing's description of female liberty, so she asked Gu Qing to take her away. After she received Gu Qing's rejection, she decided to run away alone.

Tuo Tan as The Father: A kind but ignorant elder. He is the father of Cui Qiao and Hanhan. He viewed Gu Qing as a part of his family, but he did not accept Gu Qing's opinions about freedom. He loved his children, but he still stuck to "The rules of the farmers" and planned to let his daughter get married with the one he chose.

Liu Qiuang as Hanhan: Cui Qiao 's brother. An innocent, kind, reckless young man who loved his families with his whole heart.

Director and cinematographer 
In 1978, Yimou Zhang and Chen Kaige entered the Beijing Film Academy at the same time, possibly due to his father Chen Huaikai, Chen Kaige applied for the directing department, while Zhang Yimou applied for the photography department for his own interests. After the two graduated in 1982, they went to work at the same film studio, Guangxi Film Studio. While working at the Guangxi Film Studio, Chen Kaige was the director and Zhang Yimou was the cameraman. The two collaborated on a film called Yellow Earth for artistic pursuits. It is also their only co-production.

Yellow Earth is Chen Kaige's first film, who is an important figure in the Chinese fifth generation cinema history. Together with Zhang Yimou, who is also an icon in the fifth generation, they created a film that "changed the face of filmmaking in the country". The chemistry between Chen Kaige and Zhang Yimou is well presented in this film because it is marked as a signature work that initiated the fifth generation Chinese cinema. Fifth generation directors create distinctive works because they add political allegories into their films that make them different from conventional and social-realist filmmaking. Unlike other state products, "their films contain sophisticated reflections on the country's history, culture and its evolution".

Historical background and cultural depiction

Revolutionary filmmaking technique 
According to the Chinese CCTV review of Yellow Earth, this film illustrates the helplessness of the people living amongst the feudal society. Unlike films in the previous generation, this film marks the beginning of a new way of filmmaking - composed of many static, extreme long shots. This new way of filmmaking emphasizes a lonely and powerless mood, that human beings are too small and weak amongst the great yellow earth. This is just like how difficult it is to bring the Shaanxi people out of poverty and feudal customs.

Background of the film production 
The film was produced in 1984 when Chen Kaige was in the Shaanxi film industry. The film illustrated a strong poetic mood. Chen Kaige had said in an interview that he would not be able to make a film like Yellow Earth again. Specifically, he explains, the film is made when Chen Kaige can intimately get in contact with Shaanxi people's life in the particular time point. At the time the film was produced, new knowledge was rushing into the country, and women gained more freedom in the new society. Yet, the battle between the new and the old society is ongoing. The film portrays that people from the old time have already been accustomed to feudal ideologies. Even though they know there are new things coming out in the world, they think they are too poor to change anything. In other words, many people from the old feudal society in Shaanxi have already given up the search for hope and change. Change is luxurious and almost impossible to get under the poor and dry environment in Shaanxi. Cuiqiao is a transitional character between the old feudal society in Shaanxi and the new era of China.

Political events 
The film is set in 1937.

1. On January 13, 1937, the Central Committee of the Communist Party of China was stationed in Yan 'an. From then on, Yan 'an became the seat of the Central Committee of the Communist Party of China, the capital of the Shaanxi-Gansu-Ningxia Border Region, the command center and strategic rear area of the War of Resistance Against Japanese Aggression and the War of Liberation.

2. On February 21, 1937, the third plenary session of the Kuomintang Central Committee passed a resolution to accept the establishment of a united front proposed by the Communist Party. At this point, 10 years of Chinese civil war basically ended. The anti-Japanese national united front has basically taken shape.

3. The July 7 Incident, also known as the Lugou Bridge Incident, took place on July 7, 1937. On the night of July 7, 1937, the Japanese garrison at Lugou Bridge looked for an excuse to attack the Chinese garrison. The "Lugou Bridge Incident" opened the prelude of the national war of resistance against Japan.

Feudal customs in Shaanxi 
The film showed a series of the feudal customs in Shaanxi, which are a real reflection of the feudal customs from the old time. For example, praying for the rain, marrying daughter to a man who she never knows (Parents' order and agent's word 父母之命，媒妁之言). However, Cuiqiao is not willing to be locked in this cage of feudal customs. Thus, Cuiqiao acts as a transitional character in the film between modernity and feudality. Yet, Cuiqiao's result tells the audience that it is not an easy way getting rid of the old customs.

Feudal customs in the film and real life of the Shaanxi people 
 Marriage assigned by the parents, women not given a choice in their life
 Praying for rain (求雨)
 Rioting 
 Dancing 
 Worship

Production

Music 
The film music of Yellow Earth is an important part of the whole film. It does not only deepen the character image but also improves the film content, which also reflects the awakening of Chinese film music in the 1980s. The story and music in Jiping Zhao' s film music in the 1980s are both based in northern China, which can clearly reflect the local conditions and people's conditions where the film takes place. The film four main roles, Jiping Zhao created in line with their own characteristics of the theme music: 《女儿歌》 《尿床歌》 《镰刀斧头老镢头》 《正月里来正月正》. The four main characters in Yellow Earth can be said to be four typical generalizations of the group images of Chinese society at the beginning of China's reform and opening up. Through field investigation, Jiping Zhao learned about the folk music where the film took place and collected creative materials. The theme music created in this way helps shape the image of the main characters and closely follows the characters' personalities.

Cinematography 
Yimou Zhang once said in his experience of Yellow Earth photography: "The Yellow Earth rarely has camera movement, most of it is almost like a 'dumb photo' shooting." The vast yellow land is quiet and deep in the still shot. This introverted and reserved shot expression is a good way to show the theme of the film. The use of fixed lenses is consistent with the basic tone of life on the yellow land. People living on the yellow land from generation to generation are backward in civilization and thought. This kind of almost frozen slow lens is like the slow historical process on the yellow land.

Colors 
The main tone of the film is earthy yellow, which is to match the symbol of motherhood of the yellow land. In addition to yellow, the film also highlights three colors, namely black cotton-padded jacket, white towel, red wedding dress, cover, etc. These colors have their theme and implication to express. Red, for example, not only symbolizes the helplessness of Chinese feudal marriage, but also represents a passion for freedom. "Zhang Yimou pointed out in an interview that colors is the most evocative narrative element, so it can be said that Zhang Yimou is undoubtedly a prominent representative of contemporary Chinese directors in terms of using color to tell stories and color modeling."

Lighting 
The light in the whole film is rather dim. Most of the scenes use obvious light contrast, the background is dark and deep, in line with the real light conditions of the era background. This kind of dark light often also carries the profound tragedy meaning and can reflect the suffering of life to some extent.

Comparison to the original novel 
The screenplay for Yellow Earth is based on a novel by Ke Lan, "Echoes in the Deep Valley" (Shengu huiyin). The inspiration of the protagonist's, Guqing's, portrayal comes from Ke Lan himself, who was once a young cultural worker from Yan'an on a folksong collection mission. The original novel, cited from an journal, "reads more like a piece of  adolescent fantasy, is about a unlikely but probable romance between Guqing and Cuiqiao, who committed suicide to defy an arranged marriage." However, in the cinematic remake of the novel, there is hardly any inkling of romantic aspiration. The author claims that "Chen Kaige managed to de-sexualize Ke Lan's original text by casting Gu Qing in his thirties and Cuiqiao as a fourteen-year-old teenager". Furthermore, Chen Kaige also gives a more positive ending to Cuiqiao, who has managed to defy her fate and escape from the constraints of feudalism.

Influence 
Yellow Earth is a contentious film that put forward some intriguing issues among censors and the local audience upon release. The relationship between this aesthetic work and political discourse is critical because of the film's story background and its release year, where major historical events took place (wars and revolutions). According to scholar Esther Yau, author of "Yellow Earth": Western Analysis and a non-Western Text, the film ironically showcases the soldier's failure to bring about any changes, both in material and ideological levels, "in the face of invincible feudalism and superstition among the masses transgresses socialist literacy standards". It is thus reflected in this film as a criticism of the patriarchal and feudal ideologies of that Chinese culture. According to Yau, it is a fact that the censors were highly dissatisfied with the film's "indulgence with poverty and backwardness", which inserts negative and poor images to the country. Although no official banning takes place, it is still considered sensitive with respect to China's censorship.

As a modernist critique of Chinese culture and history, Yellow Earth is a pioneering work made among other Chinese films during the same period, that inspires international intellectuals as well as other Chinese fifth generation filmmakers.  According to Tian Zhuang Zhaung said in 1986,"If it wasn't for Yellow Earth, then there wouldn't have been the whole debate about film aesthetics...[the film] represents the future of Chinese cinema now.". It is also true that the addition of Daoist aesthetics added extra layers of meaning to the films that differentiate it from other Communist products during that period, according to scholar Mary Farquhar, author of The "Hidden" Gender in Yellow Earth. Another scholar, Stephanie Donald, author of Landscape and Agency Yellow Earth and the Demon Lover, points out that the shots of landscapes in the film play an important role. According to Donald, the landscape provides not just a backdrop for the drama of history, but also a process to rewrite or reinscribe history. He claims that the landscape has a specific meaning to reassert the meaning of China and its history across 50 years of revolutionary control. The depiction of the landscape, ethnic traditions and village lives reveals human conditions. In addition, as stated by Chen Kaige in an interview, Yellow Earth is a symbolic work that highlights the lives of peasants and hints at a "voice of reform".

Reception 
Esther C. M. Yau from Film Quarterly described the film as being a "significant instance of a non-western alternative in recent narrative film-making". He compared the cinematography of the film to classical Chinese art, using a limited amount of colors, natural lighting, and a non-perspectival use of filmic space. He also expressed how the film was a radical departure from mainstream styles and narrative filmmaking in China. The film was proposed as an "avant-gardist" attempt by young Chinese filmmakers, from the Fifth Generation, taking inspiration from the abstractionist qualities of classical Chinese art. However, the initial reception of it in China was mixed. Although there was no full-scale ban of this film, the censor was dissatisfied with the film's "indulgence with poverty and backwardness projecting a negative image of the country". Critics also called the film being opaque and flat, in comparison to other melodramas in China at the time, particularly highlighting the scene when Cui Cao is forced to marry an old stranger. The film was also scrutinized for being ironic in its depiction of revolutionary ideals in comparison to the reality of how the soldiers failed to bring out any material or ideological changes within the story.

Nevertheless, reception of this film outside China was mostly positive, where during its premiere at the 1985 Hong Kong International Festival, it was touted as "an outstanding breakthrough", "expressing deep sentiments poured onto one's national roots", and "a bold exploration of film languages". Richard James Havis, the author of Changing the Face of Chinese Cinema: An Interview with Chen Kaige, said that the film "immediately brought attention to" the "Fifth Generation" of Chinese filmmakers". Havis said that the film "proved a sensation" at the Hong Kong International Festival. The positive reception of this film outside of China had changed attitudes towards even within China, prompting many locals to support this film through the box office.

References

External links 
 
 
 Yellow Earth at the Chinese Movie Database
 
Yellow Earth (1984) with English subtitles on Youtube
4th and 5th Generations of Chinese Filmmaking
Fifth Generation retrospective at HKIFF

Further reading 
1. Ni, Zhen, and e-Duke Books Scholarly Collection Backlist. Memoirs from the Beijing Film Academy: The Genesis of China's Fifth Generation. Duke University Press, Durham, 2002;2003

2. Li, H. C. Color, Character, and Culture: On Yellow Earth, Black Cannon Incident, and Red Sorghum.

See also 
 
 

1984 films
1984 drama films
Chinese drama films
1980s Mandarin-language films
Second Sino-Japanese War films
Films set in Shaanxi
Films set in 1939
Films directed by Chen Kaige
1984 directorial debut films